Visual Installer is a setup tool developed by SamLogic that can be used to create installation programs and setup packages for the Microsoft Windows platform. Both client and server versions of Windows is supported by the tool. The first version of Visual Installer was released in 1995.

Features
Some key features for SamLogic's Visual Installer are:

 Supports Windows 10, Windows 8, Windows 7, Windows Vista, Windows XP, Windows 2000.
 Created setup packages can also be run on server versions of Windows.
 Both 32 bit and 64 bit software can be installed.
 Can generate a single EXE file for distribution.
 Can create installers for Visual Basic applications and Excel Add-ins.
 Can automatically code sign a setup package.
 License keys and passwords are handled. A license key generator is included.

See also 
List of installation software

References

External links 
 

Installation software